Eugen Malmstén (16 February 1907, in Helsinki – 1 September 1993, in Helsinki) was a Finnish musician, singer, orchestra conductor, composer, lyricist and actor. He was the brother of Georg Malmstén, and was of Russian descent through his mother, Eugenie Petroff.

References

External links

1907 births
1993 deaths
Singers from Helsinki
People from Uusimaa Province (Grand Duchy of Finland)
Swedish-speaking Finns
Finnish male composers
20th-century Finnish male singers
Swedish-language singers
Finnish military personnel of World War II
20th-century Finnish male actors
Male actors from Helsinki
Finnish people of Russian descent
20th-century Finnish composers